Mandel Szkolnikoff (28 January 1895 – 10 June 1945), better known as Michel Szkolnikoff, was a French businessman.

Early life
Mandel Szkolnikoff was born on 28 January 1895 in Sharkawshchyna in the Russian Empire, now in Belarus. He was Jewish. He had a German passport.

Career
Szkolnikoff was a major economic collaborator in the occupied France during the Second World War. Less known than Joseph Joanovici, he made a considerable fortune by supplying the Kriegsmarine and then the SS, mainly in textile, and was described as "the man who pushed the practice of black market to an extreme."

He reinvested his returns to build a real estate empire.

Death
He was found dead on 10 June 1945 near Madrid in Spain.

References

1895 births
1945 deaths
People from Sharkowshchyna District
Deaths in Spain
French collaborators with Nazi Germany
Belarusian Jews
Jews from the Russian Empire
Jewish collaborators with Nazi Germany
French billionaires
Emigrants from the Russian Empire to Spain